Stephen Carr (born 6 January 1966 in Sydney) is an Australian former pair skater. With his sister, Danielle, he is a nineteen-time (1980–1998) Australian national champion. They competed at the 1992 Winter Olympics, placing 13th, the 1994 Winter Olympics, placing 11th, and the 1998 Winter Olympics, again placing 13th. They retired from competitive skating around 1998. During their career, they were coached by Sergei Shakhrai and Kerry Leitch.

As of 2006, Carr was working as a skating coach in Sydney, Australia. He coached Sean Carlow and Emma Brien / Stuart Beckingham.

Results
GP: Champions Series (Grand Prix)

Singles

Pairs with Danielle Carr

References

External links
 Figure skating corner profile

1966 births
Living people
Australian male pair skaters
Olympic figure skaters of Australia
Figure skaters at the 1992 Winter Olympics
Figure skaters at the 1994 Winter Olympics
Figure skaters at the 1998 Winter Olympics
Australian figure skating coaches